Homer Maurice Doke (born November 18, 1938 died June 5, 2018) was an American football player and state legislator. He was an outstanding football player at Wichita Falls Senior High School. Doke attended the University of Texas and played college football at the guard and linebacker positions for the Texas Longhorns from 1957 to 1959.  He was selected by the Football Writers Association of America as a first-team player on its 1959 College Football All-America Team, and he received second-team honors from the Associated Press. While attending the University of Texas, Doke also received Academic All-America honors, served as editor-in-chief of the UT Chemical Engineering Society Magazine, and was a Rhodes Scholar candidate. He later served two terms in the Texas House of Representatives from 1963 to 1967.

References

American football guards
Texas Longhorns football players
Players of American football from Texas
Sportspeople from Corpus Christi, Texas
1938 births
Living people